Cristian Luciano de Carvalho (born April 14, 1980 in Ipatinga) is a Brazilian footballer who last played for Charlotte Eagles in the USL Second Division.

Career
Carvalho played for the youth team of Brazilian professional side Ipatinga, and went on to play for Gama and Cruzeiro. He moved to Greece to play for Niki Volos in 2008, and played for Paykan in Iran in 2009.

Carvalho signed with Charlotte Eagles of the USL Second Division in 2010, after a good showing at their invitational-only tryout. He made his debut on for the Eagles on June 12, 2010 in a game against the Real Maryland Monarchs.

He was not listed on the 2011 roster for Charlotte.

References

External links
 Charlotte Eagles bio

1980 births
Living people
Brazilian footballers
Ipatinga Futebol Clube players
Sociedade Esportiva do Gama players
Cruzeiro Esporte Clube players
Niki Volos F.C. players
Paykan F.C. players
Charlotte Eagles players
Expatriate footballers in Iran
USL Second Division players
Association football forwards